The 3rd Golden Satellite Awards, given by the International Press Academy, honored the best in film and television for 1998.

Special achievement awards
Mary Pickford Award (for outstanding contribution to the entertainment industry) – Alan J. Pakula

Outstanding New Talent – Eamonn Owens

Motion picture winners and nominees

Best Actor – Drama
 Edward Norton – American History X
Stephen Fry – Wilde
Brendan Gleeson – The General
Derek Jacobi – Love Is the Devil: Study for a Portrait of Francis Bacon
Nick Nolte – Affliction
Ian McKellen – Gods and Monsters

Best Actor – Musical or Comedy
 Ian Bannen – Waking Ned (TIE)  David Kelly – Waking Ned (TIE)
Warren Beatty – Bulworth
Jeff Bridges – The Big Lebowski
Michael Caine – Little Voice
Robin Williams – Patch Adams

Best Actress – Drama
 Cate Blanchett – Elizabeth
Helena Bonham Carter – The Theory of Flight
Fernanda Montenegro – Central Station (Central do Brasil)
Susan Sarandon – Stepmom
Meryl Streep – One True Thing
Emily Watson – Hilary and Jackie

Best Actress – Musical or Comedy
 Christina Ricci – The Opposite of Sex
Jane Horrocks – Little Voice
Holly Hunter – Living Out Loud
Gwyneth Paltrow – Shakespeare in Love
Meg Ryan – You've Got Mail

Best Animated or Mixed Media Film
 A Bug's Life
Antz
Mulan
The Prince of Egypt
The Rugrats Movie

Best Art Direction
 The Truman Show – Dennis Gassner
Beloved
Elizabeth
Pleasantville
Shakespeare in Love

Best Cinematography
 The Thin Red Line – John Toll
Beloved
Pleasantville
Saving Private Ryan
Shakespeare in Love

Best Costume Design
 Elizabeth – Alexandra Byrne
Beloved
Ever After
Pleasantville
Shakespeare in Love

Best Director
 Terrence Malick – The Thin Red Line
John Boorman – The General
Shekhar Kapur – Elizabeth
Gary Ross – Pleasantville
Steven Spielberg – Saving Private Ryan

Best Documentary Film
 Ayn Rand: A Sense of Life
The Cruise
The Farm: Angola, USA
Kurt & Courtney
Public Housing

Best Editing
 Saving Private Ryan – Michael Kahn
Beloved
Pleasantville
Shakespeare in Love
The Thin Red Line

Best Film – Drama
 The Thin Red Line
Elizabeth
The General
Gods and Monsters
Saving Private Ryan

Best Film – Musical or Comedy
 Shakespeare in Love
Little Voice
Pleasantville
Waking Ned
You've Got Mail

Best Foreign Language Film
 Central Station (Central do Brasil), Brazil
The Celebration (Festen), Denmark
Life Is Beautiful (La vita è bella), Italy
Only Clouds Move the Stars (Bare skyer beveger stjernene), Norway
The Separation (La Séparation), France

Best Original Score
 "The Thin Red Line" – Hans Zimmer
"Beloved" – Rachel Portman
"City of Angels" – Gabriel Yared
"Pleasantville" – Randy Newman
"Saving Private Ryan" – John Williams

Best Original Song
 "I Don't Want to Miss a Thing" performed by Aerosmith – Armageddon
"Anyone at All" – You've Got Mail
"The Flame Still Burns" – Still Crazy
"That'll Do" – Babe: Pig in the City
"When You Believe" – The Prince of Egypt

Best Screenplay – Adapted
 Gods and Monsters – Bill Condon
Beloved – Adam Brooks, Akosua Busia and Richard LaGravenese
Hilary and Jackie – Frank Cottrell Boyce
Little Voice – Mark Herman
The Thin Red Line – Terrence Malick

Best Screenplay – Original
 Pleasantville – Gary Ross
American History X – David McKenna
Central Station (Central do Brasil) – Marcos Bernstein and João Emanuel Carneiro
Saving Private Ryan – Robert Rodat
Shakespeare in Love – Marc Norman and Tom Stoppard

Best Supporting Actor – Drama
 Donald Sutherland – Without Limits
Robert Duvall – A Civil Action
Jason Patric – Your Friends & Neighbors
Tom Sizemore – Saving Private Ryan
Billy Bob Thornton – A Simple Plan

Best Supporting Actor – Musical or Comedy
 Bill Murray – Rushmore
Jeff Daniels – Pleasantville
John Goodman – The Big Lebowski
Bill Nighy – Still Crazy
Geoffrey Rush – Shakespeare in Love

Best Supporting Actress – Drama
 Kimberly Elise – Beloved
Kathy Burke – Dancing at Lughnasa
Beverly D'Angelo – American History X
Thandie Newton – Beloved
Lynn Redgrave – Gods and Monsters

Best Supporting Actress – Musical or Comedy
 Joan Allen – Pleasantville
Kathy Bates – Primary Colors
Brenda Blethyn – Little Voice
Julianne Moore – The Big Lebowski
Joan Plowright – Dance with Me

Best Visual Effects
 What Dreams May Come – Ellen Somers
Armageddon
Babe: Pig in the City
Saving Private Ryan
Star Trek: Insurrection

Outstanding Motion Picture Ensemble
The Thin Red Line

Television winners and nominees

Best Actor – Drama Series
 Ernie Hudson – Oz
George Clooney – ER
Dylan McDermott – The Practice
Jimmy Smits – NYPD Blue
Michael T. Weiss – The Pretender

Best Actor – Musical or Comedy Series
 Drew Carey – The Drew Carey Show
Michael J. Fox – Spin City
Kelsey Grammer – Frasier
John Lithgow – 3rd Rock from the Sun
Paul Reiser – Mad About You

Best Actor – Miniseries or TV Film
 Delroy Lindo – Glory & Honor
Cary Elwes – The Pentagon Wars
Laurence Fishburne – Always Outnumbered
Kevin Pollak – From the Earth to the Moon
Patrick Stewart – Moby Dick

Best Actress – Drama Series
 Jeri Ryan – Star Trek: Voyager
Gillian Anderson – The X-Files
Sharon Lawrence – NYPD Blue
Rita Moreno – Oz
Andrea Parker – The Pretender

Best Actress – Musical or Comedy Series
 Ellen DeGeneres – Ellen
Calista Flockhart – Ally McBeal
Helen Hunt – Mad About You
Phylicia Rashad – Cosby
Brooke Shields – Suddenly Susan

Best Actress – Miniseries or TV Film
 Angelina Jolie – Gia
Olympia Dukakis – More Tales of the City
Mia Farrow – Miracle at Midnight
Barbara Hershey – The Staircase
Jennifer Jason Leigh – Thanks of a Grateful Nation

Best Miniseries or TV Film
 From the Earth to the Moon
A Bright Shining Lie
Gia
More Tales of the City
Thanks of a Grateful Nation

Best Series – Drama
 Oz
ER
NYPD Blue
The Pretender
The X-Files

Best Series – Musical or Comedy
 Ellen
3rd Rock from the Sun
Frasier
Mad About You
Suddenly Susan

Best Supporting Actor – (Mini)Series or TV Film
 David Clennon – From the Earth to the Moon
Brian Dennehy – Thanks of a Grateful Nation
Lance Henriksen – The Day Lincoln Was Shot
Martin Short – Merlin
Daniel Williams – Always Outnumbered

Best Supporting Actress – (Mini)Series or TV Film
 Rita Wilson – From the Earth to the Moon
Jackie Burroughs – More Tales of the City
Faye Dunaway – Gia
Shirley Knight – The Wedding
Amy Madigan – A Bright Shining Lie

New Media winners and nominees

Best Home Entertainment Product/Game
Dilbert's Desktop Games
Gran Turismo
Half-Life
Madden NFL 99
NBA Live 99

CD-ROM Entertainment
Big Brother
Baldur's Gate
Heretic II
Rainbow Six
Unreal

Awards breakdown

Film
Winners:
5 / 7 The Thin Red Line: Best Cinematography / Best Director / Best Film – Drama / Best Original Score & Outstanding Motion Picture Ensemble
2 / 3 Waking Ned: Best Actor – Musical or Comedy (2x)
2 / 5 Elizabeth: Best Actress – Drama / Best Costume Design
2 / 10 Pleasantville: Best Screenplay – Original / Best Supporting Actress – Musical or Comedy
1 / 1 A Bug's Life: Best Animated or Mixed Media Film
1 / 1 Ayn Rand: A Sense of Life: Best Documentary Film
1 / 1 The Opposite of Sex: Best Actress – Musical or Comedy
1 / 1 Rushmore: Best Supporting Actor – Musical or Comedy
1 / 1 The Truman Show: Best Art Direction
1 / 1 What Dreams May Come: Best Visual Effects
1 / 1 Without Limits: Best Supporting Actor – Drama
1 / 2 Armageddon: Best Original Song
1 / 3 American History X: Best Actor – Drama
1 / 3 Central Station (Central do Brasil): Best Foreign Language Film
1 / 4 Gods and Monsters: Best Screenplay – Adapted
1 / 8 Beloved: Best Supporting Actress – Drama
1 / 8 Saving Private Ryan: Best Editing
1 / 8 Shakespeare in Love: Best Film – Musical or Comedy

Losers:
0 / 5 Little Voice
0 / 3 The Big Lebowski, The General, You've Got Mail
0 / 2 Babe: Pig in the City, Hilary and Jackie, The Prince of Egypt

Television
Winners:
3 / 4 From the Earth to the Moon: Best Miniseries or TV Film / Best Supporting Actor & Actress – (Mini)Series or TV Film
2 / 2 Ellen: Best Actress – Musical or Comedy Series / Best Series – Musical or Comedy
2 / 3 Oz: Best Actor – Drama Series / Best Series – Drama
1 / 1 The Drew Carey Show: Best Actor – Musical or Comedy Series
1 / 1 Glory & Honor: Best Actor – Miniseries or TV Film
1 / 1 Star Trek: Voyager: Best Actress – Drama Series
1 / 3 Gia: Best Actress – Miniseries or TV Film

Losers:
0 / 3 Mad About You, More Tales of the City, NYPD Blue, The Pretender, Thanks of a Grateful Nation
0 / 2 3rd Rock from the Sun, A Bright Shining Lie, Always Outnumbered, ER, Frasier, Suddenly Susan, The X-Files

References
 International Press Academy website – 1999 3rd Annual SATELLITE Awards (archive link)

Satellite Awards ceremonies
1998 awards
1998 film awards
1998 television awards